This is a list of historic places on the Avalon Peninsula in the Canadian province of Newfoundland and Labrador. This list contains entries on the Canadian Register of Historic Places, whether they are federal, provincial, or municipal, and excludes the more than 150 listings from the city of St. John's, which are listed separately.

List of historic places

See also
 List of historic places in Newfoundland and Labrador
 List of National Historic Sites of Canada in Newfoundland and Labrador

Avalon Peninsula